The Constitution of the State of New Mexico is the document governing the political framework of the U.S. state of New Mexico. It was adopted by Constitutional Convention on November 21, 1910, ratified by vote of the people on November 5, 1911, and became effective upon admission to the union on January 6, 1912.

1910 Constitutional Convention 
The constitution was drafted by 100 delegates elected by the people of New Mexico. Of the 100 delegates, there were 71 Republicans, 28 Democrats, and one socialist. Worried that the conservative federal government would refuse to extend statehood to New Mexico, the Republican-control convention framed the constitution to be conservative and non-controversial.

New Mexico Democrats did not agree with the contents of the constitution and fought the Republicans at each step. The Democrats organized a separate party convention on December 19, 1910, and drafted thirteen objections to the constitution draft. The Democrats were primarily concerned with the difficulty of the amendment process, the unequal distribution of the legislature, and the lack of provisions addressing recall votes. However, their objections did not change the final proposed constitution draft that the people voted on. On January 21, 1911, the constitution was approved by the people with a three-to-one majority. And on January 6, 1912, New Mexico was admitted to the Union.

Constitutional Amendments

Flood amendment
As originally drafted and sent to the United States Congress, the New Mexico Constitution contained a number of limitations on the process for making amendments. These included 

 a requirement of a two-thirds vote of the legislature in order to propose amendments,
 that in addition to a bare majority, all amendments must be ratified by at least 40% of those voting in the election, with a 40%+ vote in at least half of the counties, and 
 a limitation on the total number of amendments that could be submitted to the people per election.

Congress was not sympathetic to these anti-populist provisions, and as a prerequisite to admission as a state required that the people ratify an amendment that would provide for a simple majority vote in the legislature, for ratification by simple majority vote of the people, and do away with the limitation on the total number of amendments. This prerequisite came to be known as the "Flood amendment" as it was proposed by Henry de la Warr Flood, a Democrat from Virginia, at the instigation of Summers Burkhart secretary of the New Mexico State Central Committee of the Democratic Party. The Flood amendment did permit two restrictions on the majority ratification, one for amendments to the elective franchise and the other for amendments to the protection of educational access of Spanish speakers or those of Spanish descent.

Between 1912 and 1969, the New Mexico constitution was amended 73 times.

1969 Constitutional Convention 
In 1967, the legislature decided that a new convention should be called to rewrite the entire constitution. Voters approved of a constitutional convention on November 8, 1968.

The convention occurred in one 60-day session in 1969 and had 70 delegates, one from each of New Mexico’s legislative districts. Of the 70 delegates, there were 48 Democrats, 21 Republicans, and one independent. The convention focused on condensing and streamlining the constitution. The final draft reduced the 1910 constitution from 24 articles and 24,000 words to 14 articles and 15,000 words.

However, the voters rejected the new constitution by the narrow margin of 63,387 to 59,685.

Current Constitution 
The constitution current has twenty-four articles. The articles each deal with a separate area of governance. 

 Article I: Name and Boundaries
 Article II: Bill of Rights
 Article III: Distribution of Powers
 Article IV: Legislative Department
 Article V: Executive Department
 Article VI: Judicial Department
 Article VII: Elective Franchise
 Article VIII: Taxation and Revenue
 Article IX: State, County, and Municipal Indebtedness
 Article X: County and Municipal Corporations
 Article XI: Corporations Other than Municipal
 Article XII: Education
 Article XIII: Public Lands
 Article XIV: Public Institutions
 Article XV: Agriculture and Conservation
 Article XVI: Irrigation and Water Rights
 Article XVII: Mines and Mining
 Article XVIII: Militia
 Article XIX: Amendments
 Article XX: Miscellaneous
 Article XXI: Compact with the United States
 Article XXII: Schedule
 Article XXIII: Intoxicating Liquors
 Article XXIV: Leases on State Land

Article II contains a bill of rights. Article IV sets up the legislature branch composed of no more than 42 members of the Senate and 70 members of the House of Representatives. Article V creates the executive branch headed by a governor. The branch consists of a governor, lieutenant governor, secretary of state, state auditor, state treasurer, attorney general and commissioner of public lands. The judicial branch is created by Article VI and consists of the Supreme Court, a Court of Appeals, and District Courts. Other court may be established. The Supreme Court has five justices, who are elected for eight years.

References

External links 

 
 The Constitution of the State of New Mexico 

New Mexico
1910 in American law
New Mexico law